Lewis Robert Page (born 20 May 1996) is an English professional footballer who  plays as a left back for League Two club Gillingham. He has UEFA Europa League experience.

Career

West Ham United 
Page was first included in a West Ham United matchday squad for their League Cup second round fixture against Sheffield United at the Boleyn Ground on 26 August 2014, but he remained an unused substitute as they lost in a penalty shootout after a 1–1 draw.

On 2 July 2015, he made his first-team debut for the club in a 3–0 home victory over Lusitanos of Andorra in the UEFA Europa League first qualifying round first leg, playing the full 90 minutes; he also played the entirety of their 1–0 victory in the second leg a week later. With manager Slaven Bilić putting priority on the team's Premier League performance, he made an array of changes for their third qualifying round second leg away to FC Astra Giurgiu on 6 August, including starting Page in his first competitive match against a professional opponent.

Cambridge United and Coventry City (loan) 
Page was loaned for a month to Cambridge United of League Two on 2 January 2016. He made his league debut later that day, playing the full 90 minutes of a 1–4 loss to AFC Wimbledon at the Abbey Stadium.

On 9 August 2016, Page joined League One side Coventry City on a five-month loan deal. He made 22 appearances before the appointment of new Coventry manager, Russell Slade, saw Page's loan terminated in January 2017.

Charlton Athletic 
On 6 January 2017, Page joined Charlton Athletic on a permanent deal until 2019. He played 22 games for Charlton, including in a 2–0 win, against Plymouth Argyle, in which Page scored his first goal in his career.

Exeter City 
After leaving Charlton, Page signed for League Two club Exeter City on 1 September 2020, after turning down a contract from rivals Plymouth. He made his debut in a 2–0 away defeat to Bristol City in the EFL Cup first round.

Harrogate Town 
After leaving Exeter City at the end of the 2020–21 season, he joined League Two side, Harrogate Town on 16 July 2021. He made his debut, coming on as a substitute, on 7 August, in a 3–2 win against Rochdale.

Mansfield Town 
On 16 November 2022, Page signed for Mansfield Town on an initial one-month contract.

Gillingham
Page joined Gillingham on a short-term contract in February 2023.

Personal life
Page grew up in Bishop's Stortford and attended The Bishop's Stortford High School.

Career statistics

References

External links

1996 births
Living people
English footballers
Association football defenders
West Ham United F.C. players
Cambridge United F.C. players
Coventry City F.C. players
Footballers from the London Borough of Enfield
English Football League players
Charlton Athletic F.C. players
Exeter City F.C. players
Harrogate Town A.F.C. players
Mansfield Town F.C. players
Gillingham F.C. players